a.k.a.   is a Japanese film director, screenwriter, and actor best known for his work in the pink film genre. Including Yutaka Ikejima, Yumi Yoshiyuki and Tarō Araki, Kunizawa is one of the four top directors of Ōkura Productions (OP) at the turn of the millennium, and the only one of the four who did not start out as an actor. Instead, Kunizawa joined the film industry as an assistant director to pink film pioneer Satoru Kobayashi. Kunizawa's films have been very popular with pink film fans, and he has had more than one film in the Top Ten at the Pink Grand Prix for multiple years. He has also won the Best Director prize twice. Irresistable Angel: Suck It All Up (2003), for which he won Best Director, is an erotic variation on the X-Men story.

Top-ten films, Pink Grand Prix
 1999 7th place (tie): 
 1999 7th place (tie): 
 2000 3rd place: The Bride is Wet on the Wedding Night
 2000 5th place (tie): 
 2001 8th place: Private Lessons: Home Teacher's Breast
 2003 4th place: Irresistable Angel: Suck It All Up
 2003 7th place: 
 2005 7th place:

Bibliography

English

Japanese

References

External links
 

 
|-
! colspan="3" style="background: #DAA520;" | Pink Grand Prix
|-

Japanese male film actors
Japanese film directors
Pink film directors
Japanese screenwriters
1964 births
Living people